"Too Close for Comfort" is a popular song by Jerry Bock, George David Weiss, and Larry Holofcener.

It was written in 1956 as part of the score for the Broadway musical Mr. Wonderful starring Sammy Davis Jr., who released the song as a single on Decca Records prior to the musical's premiere. Several other pop vocalists, such as Eileen Barton, also recorded their own competing versions around this time, as well as other songs from the musical.

Notable versions
A memorable 1956 duet of the song featured Ella Fitzgerald and Joe Williams, although the 1958 recordings by Davis and Frank Sinatra are the best-known versions of the song. 
It also was recorded by Jamie Cullum in 2002 for his album Pointless Nostalgic
Dianne Reeves (in 2005) for the Grammy Award-winning soundtrack to Good Night, and Good Luck.

Other versions include:
Stan Getz - The Steamer (1956)
Eydie Gormé - Her single recording charted at #39 in the U.S. (1956) and was included on her album Eydie Gormé (1957)

Johnny Mathis - Wonderful, Wonderful (1957)
Herbie Nichols - Love, Gloom, Cash, Love (Bethlehem BCP81 1957)
Harry James - Harry James And His New Swingin' Band (MGM SE-3778, 1959)
Plas Johnson - This Must Be The Plas (1959)
Marty Paich - The Broadway Bit (Warner Bros. Records, 1959)
Peggy Lee - Pretty Eyes (1960)
Art Pepper - Intensity (1960)
Mel Tormé - Swings Shubert Alley (1960)
Les McCann - Les McCann Ltd. Plays the Shampoo (1961)
Natalie Cole - Take a Look (1993)
Christian McBride - Gettin' to It (1995)
Gordon Goodwin's Big Phat Band, featuring Dianne Reeves - The Phat Pack (2006)
Accent Vocal - Here We Are (2015)

References

1956 songs
Songs written by George David Weiss
Male–female vocal duets
Songs written by Jerry Bock
Songs written by Lawrence Holofcener
Johnny Mathis songs